is a former Japanese football player. Masaya Nozaki is his brother.

Playing career
Keita Nozaki played for J2 League club; Thespakusatsu Gunma from 2013 to 2015.

References

External links

1990 births
Living people
Toyo University alumni
Association football people from Saitama Prefecture
Japanese footballers
J2 League players
Thespakusatsu Gunma players
Association football forwards